Julie Andrieu (born 27 February 1974) is a French television/radio presenter and food critic.

Biography 
Andrieu was born in Paris, the daughter of actress Nicole Courcel, married to a man much younger than her and who abandoned her during her pregnancy. She and her mother lived for a year with Jean-Pierre Coffe, who was a close friend. She has a half-brother and a half-sister from her father's side. She is also the cousin of writer Marc Levy and actress Cathy Andrieu.

She started her career at age 18 as a photographer for France Soir. At age 20, she learnt to prepare small dishes to please her partner, the photographer Jean-Marie Périer. She published in 1999 her first cookbook titled La Cuisine de Julie and became in 2000 a food critic for the Guide Lebey.

Since 2001, she has hosted several radio and television programs on cooking:
Tout un plat, program on channel Téva, 2001
Votre table, program on radio RMC Info, 2002
Julie autour du monde, program on channel Cuisine+, 2003
Julie cuisine, daily program on channel TF1, 2004–05
Droit dans le buffet, weekly program on radio Europe 1, 2005
Fourchette & Sac à Dos, weekly program on channel France 5, 2007
Côté cuisine, daily program on channel France 3, 2009
Les carnets de Julie, weekly program on channel France 3, 2012

Since September 2009, she has been a food columnist in the daily television program C à vous presented by Alessandra Sublet on France 5, preparing almost every evening a recipe during the show. In 2012, she replaced Alessandra Sublet during her pregnancy by hosting the program every Friday.

She also collaborates on the weekly television magazine Télé 7 Jours for the rubric À table. She has published a number of books of recipes and cooking advice, created her own website and produced several television programs titled, such as Julie chez vous, where she visits individuals to make an inventory of their closets, advise and develop a recipe with the material they have.

Personal life 
Andrieu married French neurosurgeon Stéphane Delajoux in August 2010. She gave birth to a boy on 26 October 2012. In September 2015, she announced expecting her second child, and gave birth to a girl on 16 December 2015.

Selected works
 Julie cuisine le monde, Alain Ducasse, November 2011
 Comment briller aux fourneaux sans savoir faire cuire un œuf, Agnès Viénot, April 2010
 Carnet de correspondances. Mes accords de goûts, Agnès Viénot, April 2009
 Julie chez vous, Marabout, September 2008
 Confidences sucrées (in collaboration with Pierre Hermé), Agnès Vienot, October 2007
 Mes secrets pour garder la ligne... sans régime, Robert Laffont, March 2007
 Le B.A.-ba du chocolat, Marabout, October 2006
 Julie cuisine avec 3 fois rien, Albin Michel, March 2006
 Julie cuisine pour garder la ligne, Albin Michel, March 2006
 Julie cuisine en quelques minutes, Albin Michel, October 2005
 Julie cuisine à l'avance, Albin Michel, October 2005
 Ma p'tite cuisine, Marabout, April 2005
 Les Cantines de Julie, Parigramme, October 2004
 Le Canard de Julie, Marabout, October 2003
 La Cuisine expliquée à ma mère, Albin Michel, October 2002
 Tout cru, Albin Michel, May 2001
 La Cuisine de Julie, Albin Michel, 1999

Guides 
 Lebey des restaurants de Paris, Albin Michel, 2005
 Petit Lebey des bistrots, Albin Michel, 2005
 Lebey des restaurants italiens de Paris, Albin Michel, 2004
 Le Guide du club des croqueurs de Chocolat, Stock, 1998

References

External links 
  

1974 births
Living people
French radio presenters
French television presenters
Food writers
Writers from Paris
Women food writers
Women cookbook writers
French women radio presenters
French women television presenters